San Marino competed at the 2022 Winter Olympics in Beijing, China, from 4 to 20 February 2022.

San Marino's team consisted of two athletes (one per gender) competing in alpine skiing. Matteo Gatti and Anna Torsani were the country's flagbearer during the opening ceremony. Gatti was also the flagbearer during the closing ceremony.

Competitors
The following is the list of number of competitors participating at the Games per sport/discipline.

Alpine skiing

By meeting the basic qualification standards San Marino qualified one male and one female alpine skier.

References

Nations at the 2022 Winter Olympics
2022
Winter Olympics